St Leonard's Church is an Anglican church in the village of Apethorpe in Northamptonshire, England. It is an active parish church in the Diocese of Peterborough. It has been designated a Grade I listed building by English Heritage.

History
The church at Apethorpe dates mostly from the 14th or 15th century, although there may have been an earlier structure on the site. A chapel and tower were added in the 17th century and the tower was restored in the 19th century. The church was designated a Grade I listed building by English Heritage on 23 May 1967. The Grade I listing is for buildings "of exceptional interest, sometimes considered to be internationally important".

Architecture

Exterior
The church is constructed of coursed limestone with ashlar dressings; the roofs are lead. Its plan consists of a nave with north and south aisles, chancel, a west tower, a chapel to the south and a south porch. The tower is of three stages, without buttresses. It has a battlemented parapet and is topped with an octagonal spire.

The north and south aisles, are both of three bays; both the aisles and the south chapel are supported by two-stage buttresses between each window.

Interior and fittings
The nave has a three-bay arcade with double-chamfered arches. There is an arch to the tower, which is chamfered and moulded. The chancel contains a carved corbel and the pulpit and baptismal font, which date from the 18th century.

The south chapel contains a large marble monument to Sir Anthony Mildmay (d. 1617) and his wife Lady Grace Mildmay (d. 1620), an effigy to Sir Richard Dalton (d. 1442) and a 19th-century marble monument to John Arthur Fane, the infant son of Lord Burghersh.

Churchyard
The churchyard contains a c. 14th century limestone ashlar cross and an 18th-century limestone ashlar chest tomb, both of which have been given a Grade II listing by English Heritage.

References

Footnotes

Sources

Further reading

Apethorpe
Apethorpe